Joe Hutton may refer to:

 Joe Hutton (piper) (1923–1995), Northumbrian smallpiper
 Joe Hutton (footballer) (1927–1999), Scottish footballer
 Joe Hutton (basketball) (1928–2009), American basketball player